Oliver Vaquer is an American actor, and podcaster.

Filmography

Film

Television

Video games

References

External links
 

American male television actors
Living people
20th-century American male actors
American male voice actors
Place of birth missing (living people)
Year of birth missing (living people)
American male video game actors
21st-century American male actors